The 2011 Porsche Carrera Cup Deutschland season was the 26th German Porsche Carrera Cup season. It began on 1 May at Hockenheim and finished on 23 October at the same circuit, after nine races. It ran as a support championship for the 2011 DTM season. British driver Nick Tandy won the championship ahead of his other countryman Sean Edwards becoming the first British driver to win the championship.

Teams and drivers

Race calendar and results

Championship standings

Drivers' championship

† — Drivers did not finish the race, but were classified as they completed over 90% of the race distance.

External links
The Porsche Carrera Cup Germany website
Porsche Carrera Cup Germany Online Magazine

Porsche Carrera Cup Germany seasons
Porsche Carrera Cup Germany